Donna Glory Theodore (born July 25, 1941) is an American actress and singer who first came to attention as a headliner at many famous nightclubs during the 1960s including the Copacabana, The Fountainebleau Hotel, the Fairmont Hotel, and the El San Juan in Puerto Rico.

Biography
Theodore began working professionally at the age of twelve.  She appeared Off-Broadway as Eustacia Vye in the 1977 Hudson Guild Theater production of Dance On A Country Grave.  Her success on Broadway led to concerts at major performance venues such as Carnegie Hall.

During the 1970s and 1980s, Theodore appeared regularly on many different talk and variety shows on television including Dick Cavett, Mike Douglas, and Merv Griffin.  She is perhaps best remembered for her appearances with Johnny Carson on The Tonight Show, making more than 50 guest appearances. Theodore also created the role of Kitty Merritt on the daytime soap opera Search for Tomorrow, appeared in the television movie Face of Fear, and acted in numerous other popular television series like B. J. and the Bear, Family, Medical Center, Lanigan's Rabbi and Rosetti and Ryan.

In 2010, she performed on concert stages throughout the United States with her critically acclaimed tribute show, A Date with Judy—the Garland Years.

Personal life

Theodore attended Amador Valley High School in Pleasanton, California. Theodore lives in Palm Springs, California, with her husband Don Martin, where they present a spiritual and motivational program called "Performing Artists Living Spiritually."

Awards and honors
Theodore won a Theater World Award and received a Tony Award nomination for her performance in the 1975 musical Shenandoah.

She was the first person to receive a Drama Desk Award in the category of Outstanding Featured Actress in a Musical. Prior to the 1974–1975 awards, Drama Desk awards did not make distinctions between the sexes or musical versus dramatic roles.

Bibliography

References

External links

1941 births
American women singers
American musical theatre actresses
American television actresses
Drama Desk Award winners
Jubilee Records artists
Living people
People from Pleasanton, California
21st-century American women